Charles W. Billings (November 26, 1866 – December 13, 1928) was a politician and competitive shooter from New Jersey who was a member of the 1912 Summer Olympics American trapshooting team that won the gold medal in team clay pigeons. He was a member of the New York Athletic Club. He competed in the Travers Island, New York clay pigeon shooting competition in both 1911 and 1913.

Biography
He was born on November 26, 1866, in Eatontown, New Jersey.

In 1912 he won the gold medal as member of the American team in the team clay pigeons competition. In the individual trap competition he finished 42nd.

Billings, who had served from 1920 until his death as the first mayor of Oceanport, New Jersey, died of a heart attack on December 13, 1928, in Deal, New Jersey.

References

1866 births
1928 deaths
American male sport shooters
People from Eatontown, New Jersey
People from Glen Ridge, New Jersey
People from Oceanport, New Jersey
Mayors of places in New Jersey
Shooters at the 1912 Summer Olympics
Olympic gold medalists for the United States in shooting
Trap and double trap shooters
Olympic medalists in shooting
Medalists at the 1912 Summer Olympics